The 2010 congressional elections in Ohio was held on November 2, 2010.  Ohio had eighteen seats in the United States House of Representatives, and all eighteen incumbent Representatives were seeking re-election in 2010.  The election was held on the same day as many other Ohio elections, and the same day as House of Representatives elections in other states.

Overview

By district
Results of the 2010 United States House of Representatives elections in Ohio by district:

Congressional districts

District 1

Democratic incumbent Steve Driehaus represented the district since 2009. He faced Republican nominee and former U.S. Congressman Steve Chabot, along with Libertarian nominee James Berns (PVS) and Green Party nominee Richard Stevenson (campaign site, PVS). In 2008, Obama carried the district with 55% of the vote. Driehaus was defeated in 2010.
Race ranking and details from CQ Politics
Campaign contributions from OpenSecrets
Race profile at The New York Times
OH - District 1 from OurCampaigns.com

Polling

Results

District 2

Republican incumbent Jean Schmidt has represented this district since 2005. She faced Democratic nominee Surya Yalamanchili, a marketing executive (PVS), and Libertarian nominee Marc Johnston (PVS). In 2008, McCain carried this district with 59% of the vote.
Race ranking and details from CQ Politics
Campaign contributions from OpenSecrets
Race profile at The New York Times
OH - District 2 from OurCampaigns.com

Results

District 3

Republican incumbent Mike Turner has represented this district since 2003. He was challenged by Democratic nominee Joe Roberts (PVS) in the general election. In 2008, McCain carried this district with 51% of the vote. 
Race ranking and details from CQ Politics
Campaign contributions from OpenSecrets
Race profile at The New York Times
OH - District 3 from OurCampaigns.com

Results

District 4

Republican incumbent Jim Jordan has represented this district since 2007. He faced Democrat Doug Litt (PVS) and Libertarian Donald Kissick (campaign site, PVS), in the general election. In 2008, McCain carried this district with 60% of the vote. 
Race ranking and details from CQ Politics
Campaign contributions from OpenSecrets
Race profile at The New York Times
OH - District 4 from OurCampaigns.com

FEC, as of June 30, 2010:

Results

District 5

Republican incumbent Bob Latta has represented this district since 2007. He faced Democratic nominee Caleb Finkenbiner (PVS) and Libertarian nominee Brian L. Smith (PVS) in the general election. In 2008, McCain carried this district with 53% of the vote.
Race ranking and details from CQ Politics
Campaign contributions from OpenSecrets
Race profile at The New York Times
OH - District 5 from OurCampaigns.com

Results

District 6

Democratic incumbent Charlie Wilson represented this district since 2007. He faced Republican nominee Bill Johnson, Libertarian nominee Martin J. "Buck" Elsass (campaign site, PVS), and Constitution Party nominee Richard E. Cadle (PVS) in the general election. In 2008, McCain carried this district with 50% of the vote. Wilson was defeated in 2010.
 
Race ranking and details from CQ Politics
Campaign contributions from OpenSecrets
Race profile at The New York Times
OH - District 6 from OurCampaigns.com

Results

District 7

Republican incumbent Steve Austria has represented the district since 2009. He faced Democrat Bill Conner (campaign site, PVS), Libertarian John D. Anderson (campaign site, PVS), and Constitution Party David Easton (PVS) in the general election. In 2008, McCain carried the district with 54% of the vote. 
Race ranking and details from CQ Politics
Campaign contributions from OpenSecrets
Race profile at The New York Times
OH - District 7 from OurCampaigns.com

Results

District 8

Republican Speaker of the House John Boehner, who has represented this district since 1991, ran for reelection. He ran against Democratic nominee and West Point Army veteran Justin Coussoule, Constitution Party nominee Jim Condit (campaign site, PVS), and Libertarian David Harlow (PVS) in the general election.

Boehner won the Republican primary with 49,639 votes (84%), winning against Manfred Schreyer and Tom McMasters. 
Race ranking and details from CQ Politics
Campaign contributions from OpenSecrets
Race profile at The New York Times
OH - District 8 from OurCampaigns.com

Results

District 9

Democratic incumbent Marcy Kaptur, who has represented this district since 1983, is running for reelection. She was challenged by Republican nominee businessman Rich Iott.  Libertarian Jeremy D. Swartz dropped out in June for family reasons. Libertarian Joseph Jaffe withdrew on September 10. In 2008, Obama carried the district with 62% of the vote. 
Debate, Fox Toledo and Toledo Free Press, October 11, 2010 (30:46)
Race ranking and details from CQ Politics
Campaign contributions from OpenSecrets
Race profile at The New York Times
OH - District 9 from OurCampaigns.com

FEC, Campaign Finance as of 6/30/10

Results

District 10

Democratic incumbent Dennis Kucinich has represented this district since 1997. He faced Republican Peter J. Corrigan (PVS) and Libertarian Jeff Goggins (PVS)in the general election. In 2008, Obama carried the district with 59% of the vote.
Race ranking and details from CQ Politics
Campaign contributions from OpenSecrets
Race profile at The New York Times
OH - District 10 from OurCampaigns.com

Results

District 11

Democratic incumbent Marcia Fudge was challenged by Republican nominee Thomas Pekarek (PVS).
Race ranking and details from CQ Politics
Campaign contributions from OpenSecrets
Race profile at The New York Times
OH - District 11 from OurCampaigns.com

Results

District 12

Republican incumbent Pat Tiberi has represented this district since 2001. He faced Democratic nominee and Franklin County Commissioner Paula Brooks (campaign site, PVS), and Libertarian nominee Travis M. Irvine (campaign site, PVS). In 2008, Obama carried the district with 54% of the vote. 
Race ranking and details from CQ Politics
Campaign contributions from OpenSecrets
Race profile at The New York Times
OH - District 11 from OurCampaigns.com

Results

District 13

Democratic incumbent Betty Sutton has represented this district since 2007. She defeated Republican car dealer Tom Ganley in the 2010 general election.  
Race ranking and details from CQ Politics
Campaign contributions from OpenSecrets
Race profile at The New York Times
OH - District 13 from OurCampaigns.com

Results

District 14

Republican incumbent Steven LaTourette has represented this district since 1995. He faced Democratic nominee and former Appellate Court judge William O'Neill in the general election, along with Libertarian nominee and accountant John Jelenic (PVS). In 2008, McCain carried the district with 49% of the vote. 
Race ranking and details from CQ Politics
Campaign contributions from OpenSecrets
Race profile at The New York Times
OH - District 13 from OurCampaigns.com

Results

District 15

Democratic incumbent Mary Jo Kilroy faced four challengers: Constitution Party nominee David Ryon (campaign site, PVS), Libertarian nominee William J. Kammerer (PVS), independent perennial candidate Bill Buckel and Republican nominee Steve Stivers whom Kilroy defeated in 2008. Kilroy was defeated in 2010.
Race ranking and details from CQ Politics
Campaign contributions from OpenSecrets
Race profile at The New York Times
OH - District 15 from OurCampaigns.com

Results

District 16

Democratic incumbent John Boccieri has represented this district since 2009. He was challenged by Republican businessman Jim Renacci and Libertarian Jeffrey Blevins (PVS). In 2008, McCain carried the district with 50% of the vote. Boccieri was defeated in 2010.
Race ranking and details from CQ Politics
Campaign contributions from OpenSecrets
Race profile at The New York Times
OH - District 16 from OurCampaigns.com

Results

District 17

Democratic incumbent Tim Ryan has represented this district since 2003. He faced Republican Jim Graham (campaign site , PVS) and Independent James Traficant, a former Democratic U.S. Congressman whom Ryan succeeded.  In 2008, Obama carried the district with 62% of the vote. 
Race ranking and details from CQ Politics
Campaign contributions from OpenSecrets
Race profile at The New York Times
OH - District 17 from OurCampaigns.com

Results

District 18

Democratic incumbent Zack Space had represented this district since 2007. He was challenged by Republican nominee State Senator Bob Gibbs and Constitution Party nominee Lindsey Sutton (PVS).  In 2008, McCain carried the district with 53% of the vote. Space was defeated in 2010.
Race ranking and details from CQ Politics
Campaign contributions from OpenSecrets
Race profile at The New York Times
OH - District 18 from OurCampaigns.com

Results

Ref: Official candidate list from the Ohio Secretary of State

References

External links
Elections at Ohio Secretary of State
Official candidate list
Official candidate list
U.S. Congress Candidates for Ohio at Project Vote Smart
Ohio U.S. House from OurCampaigns.com
Campaign contributions for U.S. Congressional races in Ohio from OpenSecrets
2010 Ohio General Election graph of multiple polls from Pollster.com

House - Ohio from the Cook Political Report

Ohio
2010
2010 Ohio elections